Chris Richards (born November 10, 1975) is a Canadian former professional ice hockey player He last played with the Mississippi RiverKings in the Central Hockey League.

Awards and honours

References

External links

1975 births
Living people
Austin Ice Bats players
Canadian ice hockey centres
Corpus Christi Icerays players
Ice hockey people from Ontario
Indianapolis Ice players
Macon Whoopee (CHL) players
Mississippi RiverKings (CHL) players
New Mexico Scorpions (CHL) players
Ohio State Buckeyes men's ice hockey players
Sportspeople from Cornwall, Ontario
Youngstown Steelhounds players
Canadian expatriate ice hockey players in the United States